Samuel Percy Cookson (born 1891, date of death unknown) was a Welsh footballer. His regular position was as a defender. He was born in Bargoed. He played for Manchester United and Bargoed Town.

External links
MUFCInfo.com profile

1891 births
Welsh footballers
Manchester United F.C. players
Year of death missing
Association football defenders